Seringes-et-Nesles is a commune in the Aisne department in Hauts-de-France in northern France.

History
The villages of Seringes and Nesles merged between 1790 and 1794.

Population

See also
 Communes of the Aisne department

References

Communes of Aisne
Aisne communes articles needing translation from French Wikipedia